Marissa Irwin is an American model best known for her appearances on the cover of Bridal Guide and in Seventeen Magazine.

A native of Canton, Ohio, she received training from the Barbizon modeling school of Akron. She now lives and works in New York City.

Marissa lives with a rare and painful disorder called Arnold–Chiari malformation secondary to Ehlers–Danlos syndrome. Her medical story has appeared in the Discovery Health Channel series Mystery Diagnosis.

References 

Female models from Ohio
People from Canton, Ohio
People with Ehlers–Danlos syndrome
Living people
Year of birth missing (living people)
21st-century American women